Väinö Pietari Hakkila (29 June 1882, in Lempäälä – 18 July 1958, in Orivesi) was a Finnish politician from Social Democratic Party of Finland.

Hakkila was elected into Parliament for terms of 1919–1945 and 1948–1958. He was deputy speaker from 1929 to 1932 and speaker of the Parliament from 1936 to 1945, including wartime period. He was Minister of Justice in the Tanner Cabinet from 1926 to 1927 and the first Social Democratic municipality mayor of Tampere for more than thirty years, 1920–1952.

Hakkila, as one of the victims of Lapua Movement, was kidnapped and beaten in July 1930.

See also
List of kidnappings

References 

1882 births
1958 deaths
20th-century Finnish lawyers
People from Lempäälä
People from Häme Province (Grand Duchy of Finland)
Social Democratic Party of Finland politicians
Ministers of Justice of Finland
Speakers of the Parliament of Finland
Finnish people of World War II
Kidnapped politicians
Members of the Parliament of Finland (1919–22)
Members of the Parliament of Finland (1922–24)
Members of the Parliament of Finland (1924–27)
Members of the Parliament of Finland (1927–29)
Members of the Parliament of Finland (1929–30)
Members of the Parliament of Finland (1930–33)
Members of the Parliament of Finland (1933–36)
Members of the Parliament of Finland (1936–39)
Members of the Parliament of Finland (1939–45)
Members of the Parliament of Finland (1948–51)
Members of the Parliament of Finland (1951–54)
Members of the Parliament of Finland (1954–58)
Missing person cases in Finland
University of Helsinki alumni